Colin Cox (11 October 1922 – 1 January 1989) was a former Australian rules footballer who played with Fitzroy and Melbourne in the Victorian Football League (VFL).

Notes

External links 

1922 births
1989 deaths
Australian rules footballers from Victoria (Australia)
Fitzroy Football Club players
Melbourne Football Club players
People educated at Wesley College (Victoria)